Hyparrhenia filipendula is a species of perennial bunchgrass commonly known as Tambookie grass, fine thatching grass, and fine hood grass.

Distribution
Hyparrhenia filipendula has a widespread native distribution, in semiarid Africa, Papuasia and Australia. It has been introduced into Sri Lanka, parts of Southeast Asia and Indonesia. It is commonly found in grasslands in combination with Themeda triandra and Hyparrhenia dissoluta.

Uses
Hyparrhenia filipendula is a fodder plant for wild and domestic grazers, but it is not well adapted to heavy grazing. In mixed grasslands with T. tiandra it produces 6.8 grams of dry matter and 0.56 grams of protein per square meter per month per centimeter of rainfall.

References

Andropogoneae
Bunchgrasses of Africa
Bunchgrasses of Asia
Poales of Australia
Flora of West Tropical Africa
Flora of West-Central Tropical Africa
Flora of Northeast Tropical Africa
Flora of East Tropical Africa
Flora of South Tropical Africa
Flora of Southern Africa
Flora of the Western Indian Ocean
Flora of China
Flora of Papuasia
Flora of Australia